Hellinsia investis is a moth of the family Pterophoridae. It is found in Costa Rica.

The wingspan is 20 mm. The forewings are grey‑white. The hindwings and fringes are grey. Adults are on wing in April, at an elevation 1,250 m.

References

Moths described in 1999
investis
Moths of Central America